Floridichthys is a genus of pupfishes native to the southeastern United States, Mexico and northern Central America. The name of this genus is a compound of Florida and the Greek for "fish", ichthys. The ichthyologist Carl Leavitt Hubbs thought that the genus was confined to Florida at the time he coined the name.

Species
There are currently two recognized species in this genus:
 Floridichthys carpio (Günther, 1866) (Goldspotted killifish)
 Floridichthys polyommus C. L. Hubbs, 1936 (Ocellated killifish)

References

Cyprinodontidae
Freshwater fish genera
Taxa named by Carl Leavitt Hubbs